This is a list of players that participated in the men's wheelchair basketball competition at the Games of the XIV Paralympiad.

Group A

The following is the Australia roster in the men's wheelchair basketball tournament of the 2012 Summer Paralympics.









The following is the United States roster in the men's wheelchair basketball tournament of the 2012 Summer Paralympics.

Group B







The following is the Great Britain roster in the men's wheelchair basketball tournament of the 2012 Summer Paralympics.





References

Men's team rosters
2012